Mustapha Farrakhan Jr. (born November 2, 1988) is an American former professional basketball player. He played college basketball for the University of Virginia.

Early life
Farrakhan is the grandson of Nation of Islam leader Louis Farrakhan and Khadijah Farrakhan. His father, Mustapha Farrakhan, is the Supreme Captain of the Nation of Islam.

Farrakhan was born in Harvey, Illinois and attended Thornton Township High School. Farrakhan has a major in Sociology and is a practicing member of the Nation of Islam.

College career
Farrakhan played four years of college basketball at the University of Virginia. In his final year of college, he averaged 13.5 points, 2.8 rebounds and 1.8 assists in 31 games played.

Professional career

2011–12 season
Farrakhan went undrafted in the 2011 NBA draft. On November 3, 2011, Farrakhan was selected by the Bakersfield Jam in first round of the 2011 NBA Development League Draft.

2012–13 season
In July 2012, Farrakhan joined the New York Knicks for the 2012 NBA Summer League. In 5 games, he averaged 9.6 points, 1.8 assists and 1.6 rebounds per game. On October 1, 2012, he signed with the Milwaukee Bucks. However, he was later waived by the Bucks on October 27, 2012.

On November 1, 2012, Farrakhan was re-acquired by the Bakersfield Jam. On November 5, 2012, he was traded to the Iowa Energy. On January 28, 2013, he was waived by the Energy. On January 31, 2013, he was acquired by the Sioux Falls Skyforce. On February 25, 2013, he was traded to the Idaho Stampede. On March 13, 2013, he was waived by the Stampede after just 6 games. He was then acquired by the Tulsa 66ers on March 15 but then waived on March 20 before appearing in a game for them.

2013–14 season
On September 30, 2013, Farrakhan signed with the Los Angeles Clippers. However, he was later waived by the Clippers on October 8, 2013. On November 18, he signed with the Melbourne Tigers for the rest of the 2013–14 NBL season.

2015–16 season
On October 22, 2015, Farrakhan signed with the Oklahoma City Thunder, but was waived just two days later. On November 3, he was acquired by the Oklahoma City Blue as an affiliate player from the Thunder. On November 14, he made his debut with the OKC Blue in a 110–104 loss to the Austin Spurs, recording 18 points, one rebound, one assist and two steals in 22 minutes. On February 27, he was waived by the Blue. On April 1, he was acquired by the Fort Wayne Mad Ants.

2019
In July 2019 he was signed by the Ball Hogs of the Big3.

References

External links
NBA D-League Profile
Profile at Eurobasket.com

1988 births
Living people
African-American basketball players
American expatriate basketball people in Australia
American men's basketball players
Bakersfield Jam players
Basketball players from Illinois
Big3 players
Idaho Stampede players
Iowa Energy players
Louis Farrakhan family
Melbourne Tigers players
Members of the Nation of Islam
Oklahoma City Blue players
People from Harvey, Illinois
Sioux Falls Skyforce players
Sportspeople from Cook County, Illinois
Virginia Cavaliers men's basketball players
Point guards
American men's 3x3 basketball players
Shooting guards